The British ambassador to North Korea is head of the United Kingdom's diplomatic mission to North Korea. The official title is His Britannic Majesty's Ambassador to the Democratic People's Republic of Korea (DPRK). The current ambassador is Dr David Ellis, who has held the role since December 2021.

History
Under the Imperial Chinese tributary system, Korea was a tributary state to China. After the United Kingdom–Korea Treaty of 1883 British Ministers to China were appointed as "Her Majesty's Envoy Extraordinary and Minister Plenipotentiary to His Majesty the Emperor of China, and also Her Majesty's Envoy Extraordinary and Minister Plenipotentiary to His Majesty the King of Corea." Britain also appointed consul-generals to be resident in Seoul, but they were not heads of mission, as the head of mission was the minister in Peking (now Beijing). In 1898, following the First Sino-Japanese War (1894–95), the Korean Empire became independent of China, and Britain appointed a chargé d'affaires who became Minister Resident when the United Kingdom and Korea exchanged envoys in 1901.

Consul-General in Seoul
1884–1885: William George Aston
1889–1896: Walter Hillier
1896-1898: John Jordan

Head of mission to Korea

Minister to China, non-resident Minister to Korea
1884–1885: Sir Harry Smith Parkes
1885–1892: Sir John Walsham, 2nd Baronet
1892–1895: Sir Nicholas O'Conor
1896–1898: Sir Claude MacDonald

Chargé d'affaires
1898–1901: John Jordan

Minister Resident
1901–1905: Sir John Jordan

Under the Japan–Korea Treaty of 1905 Korea became a protectorate of Japan, and Britain and other countries withdrew diplomatic missions from Seoul. After World War II Japan's rule ended and Korea was occupied by the Soviet Union and United States, resulting in division of Korea between the Democratic People's Republic of Korea (North Korea) and the Republic of Korea (South Korea).

Head of mission to North Korea
After Britain and North Korea re-established diplomatic relations in 2000, James Hoare was appointed British Chargé d'affaires in Pyongyang; and his work laid the foundation for the establishment of a full embassy in the North Korean capital.

The British Embassy in Pyongyang opened in July 2001. David Slinn was the first British Ambassador; he arrived in Pyongyang in November 2002.

Chargé d'affaires in North Korea
 James Hoare, 2001–2002

Ambassador to North Korea

See also
 Embassy of the United Kingdom, Pyongyang
 List of diplomatic missions of the United Kingdom
 List of diplomatic missions in North Korea
 List of ambassadors of the United Kingdom to South Korea

Notes

References
 Korean Mission to the Conference on the Limitation of Armament, Washington, D.C., 1921–1922. (1922). Korea's Appeal to the Conference on Limitation of Armament. Washington: U.S. Government Printing Office. OCLC 12923609

External links
UK and North Korea, gov.uk

Korea North
 
United Kingdom